Randall W.  Breuer (born October 11, 1960) is a retired American professional basketball player who was selected by the Milwaukee Bucks in the first round (18th pick overall) of the 1983 NBA draft. A 7'3" center from the University of Minnesota, Breuer played in 11 NBA seasons from 1983 to 1994. He played for the Bucks, Minnesota Timberwolves, Atlanta Hawks and Sacramento Kings.

Breuer's best year as a pro came during the 1987–88 season as a member of the Bucks, appearing in 81 games and averaging 12.0 points and 6.8 rebounds per game. In his career, he played in 681 games and scored a total of 4,599 points. On December 2 of that season, Breuer had arguably his best game as a Buck when he scored 33 points, grabbed 11 rebounds, and blocked 4 shots in a 115–105 loss against the Detroit Pistons.

As a member of the Lake City high school team, he led them to consecutive state titles in 1978 and 1979. He was named Minnesota Mr. Basketball in 1979, along with Greg Downing.

NBA career statistics

Regular season

|-
| align="left" | 1983–84
| align="left" | Milwaukee
| 57 || 8 || 8.3 || .384 || .000 || .696 || 1.9 || 0.3 || 0.2 || 0.7 || 2.9
|-
| align="left" | 1984–85
| align="left" | Milwaukee
| 78 || 0 || 13.9 || .511 || .000 || .701 || 3.3 || 0.5 || 0.3 || 1.1 || 5.3
|-
| align="left" | 1985–86
| align="left" | Milwaukee
| 82 || 63 || 21.9 || .477 || .000 || .712 || 5.6 || 1.4 || 0.6 || 1.4 || 8.4
|-
| align="left" | 1986–87
| align="left" | Milwaukee
| 76 || 10 || 19.3 || .485 || .000 || .584 || 4.6 || 0.6 || 0.7 || 0.8 || 7.9
|-
| align="left" | 1987–88
| align="left" | Milwaukee
| 81 || 73 || 27.9 || .495 || .000 || .657 || 6.8 || 1.3 || 0.6 || 1.3 || 12.0
|-
| align="left" | 1988–89
| align="left" | Milwaukee
| 48 || 4 || 10.7 || .480 || .000 || .549 || 2.8 || 0.5 || 0.2 || 0.8 || 4.2
|-
| align="left" | 1989–90
| align="left" | Milwaukee
| 30 || 8 || 18.5 || .462 || .000 || .627 || 4.2 || 0.4 || 0.3 || 1.1 || 6.8
|-
| align="left" | 1989–90
| align="left" | Minnesota
| 51 || 47 || 26.0 || .416 || .000 || .662 || 5.7 || 1.6 || 0.6 || 1.5 || 10.2
|-
| align="left" | 1990–91
| align="left" | Minnesota
| 73 || 44 || 20.6 || .453 || .000 || .443 || 4.7 || 1.0 || 0.5 || 1.1 || 5.9
|-
| align="left" | 1991–92
| align="left" | Minnesota
| 67 || 25 || 17.6 || .468 || .000 || .532 || 4.2 || 1.3 || 0.4 || 1.5 || 5.4
|-
| align="left" | 1992–93
| align="left" | Atlanta
| 12 || 0 || 8.9 || .484 || .000 || .400 || 2.3 || 0.5 || 0.2 || 0.3 || 2.7
|-
| align="left" | 1993–94
| align="left" | Sacramento
| 26 || 3 || 9.5 || .308 || .000 || .214 || 2.2 || 0.3 || 0.2 || 0.7 || 0.7
|- class="sortbottom"
| style="text-align:center;" colspan="2"| Career
| 681 || 285 || 18.4 || .467 || .000 || .628 || 4.4 || 0.9 || 0.4 || 1.1 || 6.8
|}

Playoffs

|-
| align="left" | 1983–84
| align="left" | Milwaukee
| 12 || - || 5.5 || .423 || .000 || .600 || 1.4 || 0.3 || 0.0 || 0.5 || 2.1
|-
| align="left" | 1984–85
| align="left" | Milwaukee
| 8 || 0 || 13.0 || .577 || .000 || .667 || 3.0 || 0.0 || 0.3 || 0.3 || 5.5
|-
| align="left" | 1985–86
| align="left" | Milwaukee
| 14 || 14 || 22.7 || .535 || .000 || .684 || 4.3 || 0.8 || 0.8 || 1.3 || 8.4
|-
| align="left" | 1986–87
| align="left" | Milwaukee
| 12 || 2 || 13.0 || .485 || .000 || .667 || 2.6 || 0.3 || 0.6 || 0.8 || 3.3
|-
| align="left" | 1987–88
| align="left" | Milwaukee
| 4 || 0 || 11.8 || .563 || .000 || .167 || 3.0 || 0.3 || 0.3 || 0.5 || 4.8
|-
| align="left" | 1988–89
| align="left" | Milwaukee
| 9 || 1 || 18.0 || .531 || .000 || .385 || 4.4 || 0.6 || 0.2 || 0.7 || 4.3
|-
| align="left" | 1992–93
| align="left" | Atlanta
| 1 || 0 || 17.0 || .250 || .000 || .000 || 2.0 || 1.0 || 0.0 || 1.0 || 2.0
|- class="sortbottom"
| style="text-align:center;" colspan="2"| Career
| 60 || 17 || 14.5 || .516 || .000 || .600 || 3.1 || 0.4 || 0.4 || 0.7 || 4.8
|}

See also
List of tallest players in National Basketball Association history

References

External links
NBA stats @ basketballreference.com

1960 births
Living people
American men's basketball players
Atlanta Hawks players
Basketball players from Minnesota
Centers (basketball)
Milwaukee Bucks draft picks
Milwaukee Bucks players
Minnesota Golden Gophers men's basketball players
Minnesota Timberwolves players
Parade High School All-Americans (boys' basketball)
People from Lake City, Minnesota
Sacramento Kings players
Sportspeople from Rochester, Minnesota